Business Plus is an Irish business magazine published in Dublin by Nalac Limited. The magazine was established in 1998. It is published monthly and its circulation was 10,660 (ABC) copies in 2006. Its editor is Nick Mulcahy, son of proprietor of The Phoenix, John Mulcahy. It has .

References

External links
Business Plus Homepage

1998 establishments in Ireland
Business magazines
Magazines published in Ireland
Magazines established in 1998
Mass media in Dublin (city)
Monthly magazines published in Ireland